Les Dépêches de Brazzaville is a French-language daily newspaper in the Republic of the Congo. It is published by ADIAC, owned by Jean-Paul Pigasse.

See also
 Media of the Republic of the Congo

References

Newspapers published in the Republic of the Congo
French-language newspapers published in Africa
Daily newspapers
Brazzaville